Bradley C. Bell (born October 4, 1985) is an American television producer and screenwriter, actor, musician, and comic book author. He is best known as co-creator and showrunner of the acclaimed web series Husbands, in which he also stars. He has also released three electronic EPs, and penned the comic book series Husbands: The Comic, based on his web series. Brad's rise to stardom was built from the social media platform "Youtube", which is where he started to grow his fanbase. Brad, also nicknamed "Cheeks", currently works and consults for VH1's Pop Up Video.

Early life and education
Brad Bell was born in Dallas, Texas. Early on, Bell identified as an artist, spending his childhood convinced that the road to success would start in Los Angeles. Upon moving to Hollywood, Bell studied film at Los Angeles City College and later became a graduate of The Second City Training Center.

Career

Early work
In 2008, he started his own YouTube channel, on behalf of which Bell created the "sugar coated satirical persona" named 'Cheeks'. As Cheeks, Bell wrote and performed critical commentary on celebrities, pop culture and politics. A fanbase was rapidly growing and Bell's reputation began to take form. As a satirist, Bell follows a philosophy described by organizers of the Ig Nobel Prize, "first make people laugh, and then make them think".

One journalist writes of Bell's persona, "under all the glitter and glitz, Cheeks is an incisive, intelligent talent who couches his social criticism in showbiz flair, because he knows what works". Though Cheeks' signature style of exuberance led some to deride it as a stereotype, Bell counters, "[If] you're not going to watch me long enough to figure out that there's more to me than my fabulousness, you're of the exact same mentality as the people you're worried are going to judge you based on my behavior".

Husbands

Bell caught the attention of television writer Jane Espenson when she discovered his pointed dissection of Carrie Prejean's public response to a question of marriage equality, during the 2009 Miss USA pageant. Speaking to Out in August 2012, Espenson said, "I was curious – who was this person who had at his age accumulated writing skills that had taken me 20 years?" A friendship developed between them eventually resulting in creating the newlywed sitcom Husbands. The first season of Husbands was shot in August 2011, and premiered to critical praise, including The New Yorkers first ever review of an online series, in which Bell was hailed as "the standout, a confident flibbertigibbet who regards himself as a modern Blanche DuBois".

The "crackling cultural commentary" of Bell's early YouTube work echoed in Husbands, lauded by Time magazine as a "much more complex and interesting story about changing mores and the conflict between individuals and social causes than, say, the pilot of NBC's The New Normal".

Espenson–a frequent collaborator of Joss Whedon–noted, "Brad has the showrunner gene", and said that Bell's work as an executive producer on Husbands reminded her of the famed Avengers director, adding, "If there is a Joss Whedon among us, it's Brad Bell". Whedon himself has been a "fan of [Brad]", since Bell's performance in The Golden Guys, an adaptation of The Golden Girls with young men in the leads, hosted at Whedon's residence during a private party.

The series was expanded in the form of a six-issue digital comic book series called Husbands: The Comic, published by Dark Horse Comics. Bell's work on Husbands inspired Jane Espenson to include the Buffyverse's first gay male slayer in season nine of Buffy the Vampire Slayer.

Bell wrote an article in The Huffington Post about unoriginal aspects of storytelling, saying "Maybe instead of avoiding the cliché, we can somehow reinvent the wheel", to which he concludes, "Husbands, both as a sitcom and as a comic book, embraces clichés, stereotypes and tropes to make a point: Most old ideas are only as meaningless or as negative as their context. Few of these notions are intrinsically detrimental, as the judgements we attach to them exist only in our minds".

Television paradigm
Bell originated the concept that the word "television" is better suited for the Internet than traditional broadcast media, and was invited to speak at Google on August 17, 2012, to elaborate on his observation:Television is a hybrid word, Greek and Latin. 'Tele' meaning far and then 'vision' meaning, well obviously, vision...So, when you think of NBC, the 'far vision' is L.A. to New York...On the other hand, you upload something to YouTube and within minutes... Tokyo. In addition to this linguistic examination, Bell pointed out that television is defined as a telecommunication medium. He goes on to say, "As anyone who's ever been in a relationship knows, communication is a two-way street". Because communication requires both parties to interact with each other, Bell reasons that the Internet better fulfills the criteria for television than a broadcast platform. He sums this idea up by concluding, "the Internet is more television than television".

Bell elaborated more on the issue:

Other work
Bell's work in music began in 2008, co-writing and performing the title track for horror short film Side Effect. This success was followed by the release of three EPs; The Boy From Venus (2008), Glambition (2009) and T.C.M.C. (2010), along with a collection of ringtones, 2009's Put a Ringtone on It. Bell has also worked as consulting producer for VH1's Pop-Up Video.

Television credits

Production credits

Accolades

References

External links
 

1985 births
21st-century American male actors
American male screenwriters
Television producers from California
American gay actors
American gay musicians
American gay writers
American LGBT singers
LGBT people from California
LGBT people from Texas
LGBT television producers
Living people
Los Angeles City College alumni
Male actors from Dallas
Male actors from Los Angeles
Musicians from Dallas
Singers from Los Angeles
Singers from Texas
Writers from Los Angeles
Screenwriters from California
Screenwriters from Texas
Television producers from Texas
21st-century American male singers
21st-century American singers
21st-century American screenwriters
21st-century American male writers
20th-century American LGBT people
21st-century American LGBT people